Anders H. Poulsen (born January 18, 1991) is a Danish ice hockey player. He is currently playing with the IK Oskarshamn of the HockeyAllsvenskan.

International
Poulsen was named to the Denmark men's national ice hockey team for competition at the 2014 IIHF World Championship.

References

External links

1991 births
Living people
Danish ice hockey forwards
Herning Blue Fox players
People from Herning Municipality
Sportspeople from the Central Denmark Region